Ronja Schütte (born 20 February 1990) is a German rower. She competed in the women's eight event at the 2012 Summer Olympics.

References

External links
 

1990 births
Living people
German female rowers
Olympic rowers of Germany
Rowers at the 2012 Summer Olympics
Sportspeople from Schleswig-Holstein